Hot Form Quench (HFQ®) is an industrial forming process for the production of deep drawn, precise and complex geometry ultra-high strength aluminium sheet components. It is a hot stamping process for certain grades of aluminium and has similarities to the press hardening of ultra-high strength steels. HFQ exploits viscoplasticity of aluminium at high temperatures to facilitate the production of lightweight structures, often replacing steel, composites, castings, extrusions or multiple cold formed pressings.

Hot Form Quench (HFQ) is a hot forming process for high strength aluminium sheet (typically) 2x, 6x and 7x series alloys, that was initially developed in the early 2000s by Professors Jianguo Lin and Trevor Dean at the University of Birmingham and then at Imperial College London, both in the UK.

Impression Technologies Limited (ITL), a materials technology company based in Coventry, UK, has exclusive commercialisation rights for HFQ, and has since developed its own additional know-how and rights in this domain. At the same time as the first HFQ applications were adopted in automotive applications (the Aston Martin DB11) in 2016, other organisations in the lightweighting ecosystem joined Impression Technologies on a Horizon 2020 programme called LoCoMaTech  with an aim to take the HFQ Technology towards mass volume applications. ITL has since started licensing the HFQ Technology around the world to manufacturers supplying the automotive and aerospace sectors.

Process 

Hot forming of aluminium alloys consists of four main steps performed on a custom-shaped sheet blank: solutionising, blank transfer, quenching and forming, and artificial aging. In the solutionising step, the blank is heated in a furnace to a temperature where the precipitates in the material dissolve. The solutionising ovens are most effective when designed with forced convection, which is a difference to those used for press hardened steel lines.

The pressing operation is carried out in a high speed hydraulic, servo-hydraulic or servo press in which the forming tool is cooled to create the necessary quenching to maintain the alloying elements in solid solution. The subsequent ageing process enables precipitation and increases the strength of the components to the required level, typically 300 to 500MPa yield, depending on the aluminium alloy used. Customised proprietary ageing processes have been developed to optimise corrosion performance and/or downstream joining properties

Following the HFQ process, parts can be in-die trimmed or laser trimmed as is typical for press hardened steel parts, dependant on production volume. It is usual for volumes below 10,000 parts per annum to be laser trimmed because of the high cost of the trim tooling; or for higher volumes if flexibility is required for future design changes, such as hole positioning. 

Although a key benefit of the HFQ process is to enable the production of complex, deep drawn pressings in a single forming operation, it is possible to perform secondary cold pressing operations after the HFQ stage if required.

Applications 
HFQ is used where light-weighting and high levels of part integration are required where aluminium sheet is considered a suitable technical and economic proposition. HFQ can be a solution for applications ranging from several hundred to millions of parts per annum. Aluminium sheet thickness ideal for HFQ range from 0.8mm to 5.0mm.

Typical HFQ applications target Body-in-White (BIW) structures and closures including A and B pillars, door rings, cross members, sills, dash panels, rear quarter inners, door inners, tailgate inners and under shields. Recently there has been significant interest in the use of HFQ for battery lids and casings for electric vehicles. Alloys used for these applications include the 6x and 7x series such as 6111, 6082, 6016 and 7075.

Aerospace applications are being developed that include lip skins, nacelles, fairings, wing ribs and seats. Other transportation sector applications include electric bicycles, motorcycles, and rail structures.

In other sectors, HFQ has been considered to replace heavy castings and machined components, currently made from aluminium where light-weighting or material utilisation are critical factors.

A critical consideration in the design of HFQ components is ensuring that the forming simulation is accurate, which is greatly influenced by the quality of the material cards for each alloy and the type of lubricant used.

Advantages and disadvantages 
HFQ’s main advantage is superior formability for ultra-high strength aluminium alloys, that would otherwise split during conventional cold forming. This leads to extremely deep drawn parts (can be >300mm), sharp radii (r/t of 0.8 of has been demonstrated) and high levels of part integration versus cold formed pressings. In addition, HFQ enables the manufacture of parts from high and ultra-high strength aluminium, which for strength dominant applications facilitates significant weight reductions of circa 20% versus some lower strength cold formed aluminium alloys. When compared to superplastic forming, which is well-established, HFQ can offer significantly higher production speeds (of up to 4 parts per minute) and a wider range of aluminium grades. Secondary benefits of HFQ include the ability to use lower cost and more widely available F Temper alloy feedstocks and even use highly recycled alloys.

The main disadvantage of HFQ compared to cold forming is a higher cycle time, although the technology is now being utilised for medium/high volume applications as its adoption becomes more widespread.

References 

Aluminium
Metalworking